This is a List of National Historic Landmarks in Delaware.  There are 14 National Historic Landmarks (NHLs) in Delaware.

NHLs

They are distributed over the three counties of Delaware. Following is a complete list:

|}

See also
National Register of Historic Places listings in Delaware
List of National Historic Landmarks by state

References

External links

 National Historic Landmarks Program, at National Park Service

Delaware
 
National Historic Landmarks